The Women's Big Bash League (known as the WBBL and, for sponsorship reasons, the Weber WBBL) is the Australian women's domestic Twenty20 cricket competition. The WBBL replaced the Australian Women's Twenty20 Cup, which ran from the 2007–08 season through to 2014–15. The competition features eight city-based franchises, branded identically to the men's Big Bash League (BBL). Teams are made up of current and former Australian national team members, the country's best young talent, and up to three overseas marquee players.

The league, which originally ran alongside the BBL, has experienced a steady increase in media coverage and popularity since its inception, moving to a fully standalone schedule for WBBL05. In 2018, ESPNcricinfo included the inaugural season in its 25 Moments That Changed Cricket series, calling it "the tournament that kick-started a renaissance".

The Adelaide Strikers are the current champions, winning their maiden title in WBBL08. The collective performance of the Sydney Sixers and the Sydney Thunder in the league's initial years—combining for four championships in the first six seasons—has partially echoed the dominance of New South Wales in the Women's National Cricket League (WNCL), the 50-over counterpart of the WBBL.

History

Women's International Cricket League
In early 2014, the formation of an international women's Twenty20 competition, based around the franchise model of the Indian Premier League was announced. Headed by former Australian cricketer Lisa Sthalekar and Australian businessman Shaun Martyn, the proposal involved six privately owned Singapore-based teams with players earning over $US40,000 per season.

There was strong support from top female players for the Women's International Cricket League (WICL) concept, and backing was sought from the International Cricket Council, while former international cricketers Geoff Lawson and Clive Lloyd were on the board of the organisation.

The concept was dealt a blow in early June, when the England and Wales Cricket Board announced that they would refuse to release centrally contracted English players. At the same time, Cricket Australia (CA) announced it would not endorse the WICL either. Both organisations expressed concern that the tournament was not being run by a national cricket board, but a private company.

Australian Women's Twenty20 Cup
Before the establishment of the Women's Big Bash League, Cricket Australia conducted a national T20 competition: the Australian Women's Twenty20 Cup. The tournament ran in conjunction with the WNCL (the national women's 50-over competition) with the final played as a double header alongside the KFC Twenty20 Big Bash and later the Big Bash League. The competition ran from the 2009–10 season to 2014–15 after some exhibition games were held from 2007 to 2009.

Cricket Australia decided to replace the competition with the Women's Big Bash League in an attempt to further heighten the profile and professionalism of elite-level female cricket, thereby ideally helping to grow grassroots participation and viewership of the game among girls and women across the country.

Establishment
On 19 January 2014, former Australian national team captain Belinda Clark revealed the planning for a women's BBL was in its early stages, with CA keen to take advantage of the rising popularity of women's cricket and the success of the men's BBL in its first season on free-to-air TV. On 19 February 2015, Cricket Australia announced that a Women's Big Bash League (WBBL) would commence in 2015–16, with teams aligned to the current men's competition. Each team's first player signing was unveiled at the official WBBL launch on 10 July 2015.

Cricket Australia CEO James Sutherland stated in a media release: "We see T20 as the premium format of the women's game and the WBBL is an exciting concept that will increase the promotion and exposure of women's cricket." He went on to claim: "Our existing female domestic competitions are arguably the strongest in the world, with the continued success of the top-ranked women's team, the Commonwealth Bank Southern Stars, a testament to that." Cricket Australia executive Mike McKenna said: "Our goal is to see cricket become the sport of choice for women and girls across the nation, whether as participants or fans."

On 13 October 2015, 100 of Australia's elite cricketers joined to pledge $20 million towards the growth of cricket in Australia, to help grassroots level Cricket, support former players and develop further opportunities for female cricketers.

Teams

The competition features the same eight city-based franchises that make up the Big Bash League. Each state's capital city features at least one team, with Sydney and Melbourne featuring two. The Sydney Thunder, the Sydney Sixers and the Brisbane Heat have each won two of the first six championships. The disproportionate success achieved by the two teams based in New South Wales, i.e. the Thunder and the Sixers, vaguely mirrors the historical dominance of the New South Wales Breakers in the Women's National Cricket League. The Sixers reached four finals throughout the first six seasons—twice as many as any other team—while producing the best overall win–loss record, and various media outlets have described them as the "glamour team" of the league.

Although the Melbourne Renegades and Melbourne Stars both use CitiPower Centre as their primary ground, they have historically differed in their choice of secondary grounds. The Renegades have hosted fixtures at regional venues west of Melbourne, such as Kardinia Park (both the major stadium and its neighbouring cricket field) and Eastern Oval, while the Stars have occasionally played home games at Casey Fields in Melbourne's south-east. A similar arrangement exists for the Sydney teams: the Thunder typically play home games at venues in the city's west while the Sixers tend to use grounds in the east, though both teams sometimes host fixtures at each other's primary ground due to the competition's "festival" structure which often sees multiple games scheduled at the same venue in a single day.

Since the move to a standalone fixture in WBBL|05, the Hobart Hurricanes remain the only team to have the same primary venue as their male counterparts: the 19,500-capacity Blundstone Arena. With women's matches no longer played as double-headers alongside men's matches, the league has shifted away from the country's biggest stadiums, such as the Melbourne Cricket Ground and Adelaide Oval, in favour of smaller and more economically viable grounds. The intimate nature of these venues have been characterised as generating a relaxed and family-friendly atmosphere at WBBL games, which the league's teams have embraced—the Perth Scorchers, for example, have made a habit of encouraging spectators to bring their pet dogs along to matches at Lilac Hill Park.

Media coverage

WBBL|01–WBBL|03 
The 2015–16 Women's Big Bash League season was initially scheduled to have eight of the 59 matches air live on Australian free-to-air network One. Impressive television ratings convinced Network Ten to move the broadcast of the first-ever Melbourne derby between the Stars and Renegades to their main channel. The all-Sydney clashes between the Thunder and the Sixers on 2 January and the final on 24 January were likewise upgraded, whilst the broadcast schedule was also expanded to include the two semi-finals on One.

Network Ten broadcast eleven games of the 2016–17 Women's Big Bash League season. The commentary team was again led by Andrew Maher and featured Mel Jones and Lisa Sthalekar alongside Jason Bennett and Pete Lazer. Every game was also live streamed via the Cricket Australia Live App, cricket.com.au and  the WBBL Facebook page.

A total of twelve 2017–18 matches were televised on free-to-air by Network Ten, including four on the opening weekend. The remaining 47 matches were live streamed on cricket.com.au, Mamamia and the Cricket Australia Live App.

WBBL|04–present
In April 2018, as part of a new six-year broadcast rights deal, Cricket Australia announced 23 matches of each season (beginning with 2018–19) would be aired live on the Seven Network and simulcast on Fox Sports' dedicated cricket channel Fox Cricket, with the remaining 36 matches to be live streamed on the CA website and app.

Ahead of the 2019–20 season, Cricket Australia announced all 59 matches would also be streamed live and on demand through Kayo Sports.

An additional three games were initially allocated TV coverage on the Seven Network and Fox Cricket for the 2020–21 season, taking the overall number of televised WBBL|06 matches to 26. Alistair Dobson, Cricket Australia's Head of Big Bash Leagues, subsequently said: "The Rebel WBBL is the world's best cricket league for women and keeps getting better, which was reflected in a 21 per cent increase in multichannel audiences last season." After the season was rescheduled to take place entirely in a Sydney hub across a concentrated five-week period, due to the COVID-19 pandemic, Seven's allocated number of games was altered to a total of 24. On 15 October 2020, Cricket Australia announced Fox Cricket would broadcast an additional twelve matches, bringing the total number of televised WBBL|06 games to 36.

Coverage of the league received another boost for the following season with Fox Cricket broadcasting an additional 23 matches, meaning WBBL07 would be the first time all games would be televised.

Sponsorship

Naming rights 
Sporting goods retailer Rebel was the official naming rights partner for WBBL|01. Rebel extended its sponsorship for a further five seasons, concluding after WBBL|06. Ahead of WBBL|07, barbecue grill manufacturer Weber was announced as the league's new official naming rights partner.

Apparel and headwear 
Majestic Athletic was the league's official team apparel supplier for the first six seasons. Ahead of WBBL|07, Nike became the competition's official apparel partner, designing and producing the playing, training and supporter wear for all eight teams. '47 became the league's official on-field headwear supplier in WBBL|05, replacing New Era.

Development

Tournament structure 
In the inaugural season, teams were required to play games in sporadic clusters, such as twice in an afternoon or four times across three days. They were also forced to occasionally meet in neutral cities, with the most notable occurrence being the WBBL03 final played between the Sydney Sixers and the Perth Scorchers at Adelaide Oval. Although such practices have become less common, they are yet to be eliminated.

The WBBL featured matches that were played as curtain-raisers to the men's Big Bash League until moving to a standalone format for the 2019–20 edition. Ahead of the 2018–19 season, Cricket Australia announced it would begin to introduce spectator admission fees for the league, starting with matches in Sydney. The WBBL04 final at Drummoyne Oval became the league's first match to sell out.

Matches are typically played at boutique venues in each state's capital city, such as Junction Oval in Melbourne and Allan Border Field in Brisbane. However, regional centres have also embraced the opportunity to host WBBL games: on 5 January 2019 at Harrup Park in Mackay, a new record for the league's highest standalone attendance was achieved; in another example, Cricket North West scheduled a weekend free of local cricket to maximise attendance for a WBBL05 game at West Park Oval in Burnie.

Player salaries
For WBBL01, players would earn between $3000 and $10,000. This was in addition to the $7000 retainer which all female domestic cricketers would earn playing in the Women's National Cricket League (WNCL). Retainers for national representatives, of which a WBBL team can sign a maximum of five per season, ranged from $19,000 to $49,000 before taking match payments and tour fees into consideration.

In April 2016, Cricket Australia (CA) increased its elite female player payment pool from $2.36 million to $4.24 million for the 2016–17 season. With maximum retainers rising to $65,000 for national representatives and up to $15,000 for the WBBL, the best Australian women cricketers would earn a base salary of around $80,000 before exceeding earnings of six-figures with match payments and tour fees. Minimum retainers also increased, with domestic players earning at least $7000 in the WBBL and $11,000 in the WNCL. Australia's top domestic female cricketers would earn $26,000.

In August 2017, after extensive negotiations with the Australian Cricketers' Association (ACA), CA announced it would increase total female player payments from $7.5 million to $55.2 million. The deal, hailed as the biggest pay rise in the history of women's sport in Australia, meant domestic players in 2017–18 would earn at least $25,659 in the WNCL and a minimum of $10,292 (average of $19,926) in the WBBL.

For 2021–22, the last year of the original deal, domestic and national team players would earn an average of $58,000 and $211,000 respectively. However, days before the beginning of WBBL|07, CA and the ACA announced a $1.2 million increase in domestic retainers—$800,000 for the WNCL and $400,000 for the WBBL, resulting in a 22% and 14% pay rise for players in each respective league. 98 women's players were signed to a WNCL state contract for 2021–22 (not including the 15 national players with a more lucrative Cricket Australia deal), 76 of whom also held a WBBL contract.

The table below details the rise in minimum and average earnings of domestic players (those playing in both the WBBL and WNCL) and nationally contracted players since the inaugural Women's Big Bash League season:

Quality of product

Scoring 
Commentators have praised the rising standard of cricket displayed throughout the WBBL's early years, particularly the improved striking ability of batters. The inaugural season was typically dominated by bowlers, with the run rate sitting at 6.29 across the competition. By the 2018–19 season, it had increased to 7.31 with batters clearing the rope nearly three-times as often. Although the rate of scoring remained steady from WBBL|04 to WBBL|05, the frequency of wickets taken and sixes hit decreased, indicating a more conservative approach by both batters and bowlers. This could possibly be attributed to the tournament's shift to the start of the summer, when pitches tend to be slower and less conducive to attacking play.

The table below details the progression of runs scored and wickets taken (per 120 balls) as well as total sixes hit and centuries scored across the first five seasons:

Sources:

Fielding 
The 2015–16 final was noted for a poor level of fielding as both teams succumbed to the occasion's high pressure. Conversely, the "incredible" semi-finals three seasons later at Drummoyne Oval featured exciting endings determined by "miracle" catching and run out plays which drew widespread acclaim. In an opinion piece for The Sydney Morning Herald, former Australian cricketer Geoff Lawson highlighted these moments of "precision" as a sign that the league had rapidly transformed into a "serious professional sporting competition" which justified CA's investment in women's cricket.

Overseas players 
The level of competition in the WBBL is enhanced by luring many of the best overseas players to Australian shores, with each team allowed up to three "marquee" signings of cricketers from other countries. South African bowler Marizanne Kapp and New Zealand all-rounder Sophie Devine are among the international signings who have been permanent fixtures in the league. However, in November 2019, after some WBBL squads had been heavily impacted by conflicting international cricket schedules—particularly teams featuring Indian and English players—newly appointed CA board member Mel Jones cited a need for greater cooperation between nations to give the league a clearer window.

Australian players 
Another feature of the league is the ongoing presence of all leading Australian female players, such as Meg Lanning and Ellyse Perry. This is a stark contrast to the BBL, in which many of the top male Australian players—including David Warner and Pat Cummins—are rarely able to participate due to Test and ODI commitments. Consequently, the WBBL is seen as an optimal means of fast-tracking the development of the country's most promising young players, enabling them to gain first-hand experience from world-class teammates and opponents. Ashleigh Gardner and Sophie Molineux are two examples of teenagers performing strongly in the league before going on to earn national selection by the age of 20.

Tournament results

Season summaries

Final summaries

Team performance

Statistics and records

All-time stats

Batting
Most runs: Beth Mooney (BRH, PRS) – 4,108
Highest score in an innings: Smriti Mandhana (SYT) – 114* (64) vs Melbourne Renegades, 17 November 2021
Highest partnership: Alyssa Healy and Ellyse Perry (SYS) – 199* vs Melbourne Stars, 3 November 2019
Most sixes: Sophie Devine (ADS, PRS) – 123

Bowling
Most wickets: Jess Jonassen (BRH) – 138
Best bowling figures in an innings: Megan Schutt (ADS) – 6/19 (3.3 overs) vs Sydney Thunder, 20 November 2022

Fielding and miscellaneous
Most catches (fielder): Bridget Patterson (ADS) – 52
Most dismissals (wicket-keeper): Alyssa Healy (SYS) – 93 (52 catches, 41 stumpings)
Most Player of the Match awards:
 Sophie Devine (ADS, PRS), Beth Mooney (BRH, PRS)  – 23 each
 Alyssa Healy (SYS), Ellyse Perry (SYS) – 19 each
 Meg Lanning (MLS, PRS) – 18
 Ashleigh Gardner (SYS), Sophie Molineux (MLR), Grace Harris (BRH, MLR), Elyse Villani (MLS, PRS, HBH) – 11 each
  Amy Satterthwaite (HBH, MLR), Stafanie Taylor (ADS, SYT) – 9 each

Team
Win–loss records:

Highest score: Sydney Sixers – 4/242 (20 overs) vs Melbourne Stars, 9 December 2017
Lowest score (all out):
Hobart Hurricanes – 66 (14.1 overs) vs Sydney Sixers, 25 January 2017
Brisbane Heat – 66 (16.1 overs) vs Melbourne Renegades, 23 December 2017
Highest successful chase:
Melbourne Renegades – 4/185 (19 overs) vs Brisbane Heat, 27 November 2019
Sydney Sixers – 5/184 (18.4 overs) vs Melbourne Stars, 22 November 2020
Lowest successful defence: Sydney Thunder – 9/104 (20 overs) vs Melbourne Stars, 17 January 2016
Biggest winning margin:
Batting first: Perth Scorchers – 104 runs vs Melbourne Renegades, 12 November 2022
Batting second: Brisbane Heat – 68 balls remaining vs Melbourne Stars, 10 January 2019
Longest winning streak: Sydney Sixers – 9 matches
Longest losing streak: Hobart Hurricanes – 10 matches
Longest head-to-head winning streak: Sydney Sixers – 11 matches vs Hobart Hurricanes

Single-season records 
Most runs: Ellyse Perry (SYS) – 778 (WBBL|04)
Most wickets: Sarah Aley (SYS) – 28 (WBBL|02)
Most dismissals (wicket-keeper): Claire Koski (SYT) – 28 (WBBL|01)
Most catches (fielder): Ellyse Perry (SYS) – 15 (WBBL|08)
Most Player of the Match awards:
Meg Lanning (MLS)  – 6 (WBBL|01)
Ellyse Perry (SYS) – 6 (WBBL|04)
Sophie Devine (ADS) – 6 (WBBL|05)
Team:
Most regular season wins: Sydney Sixers – 11 (WBBL|08)
Best regular season NRR: Brisbane Heat –  (WBBL|04)
Most regular season losses:
Hobart Hurricanes – 12 (WBBL|03, WBBL|04)
Melbourne Stars – 12 (WBBL|05)
Worst regular season NRR: Hobart Hurricanes –  (WBBL|03)

Source:

Hat-tricks
The following is a list of hat-tricks taken in the WBBL, in chronological order:

Nicole Bolton (PRS) vs Hobart Hurricanes, 19 December 2015
Gemma Triscari (MLS) vs Sydney Thunder, 15 January 2016
Amy Satterthwaite (HBH) vs Sydney Thunder, 16 January 2017
Dane van Niekerk (SYS) vs Hobart Hurricanes, 17 December 2017
Marizanne Kapp (SYS) vs Melbourne Stars, 26 October 2019
Darcie Brown (ADS) vs Brisbane Heat, 24 October 2021

See also

Australian Women's Twenty20 Cup
Women's National Cricket League
Women's cricket in Australia
Australia women's national cricket team
Big Bash League
Cricket Australia
Women's franchise cricket

Notes

References

External links
 
 Schedule & Fixtures
 Series home at ESPN Cricinfo
 How The first WBBL season changed cricket, ESPNcricinfo

 
Big Bash League
Australian domestic cricket competitions
Professional sports leagues in Australia
2015 establishments in Australia
Sports leagues established in 2015
Twenty20 cricket leagues
!
Women's Twenty20 cricket competitions
Recurring sporting events established in 2015